Nancy was launched in 1792 and traded with Quebec. In 1793 she made one voyage for the British East India Company (EIC). On her return, the Sierra Leone Company purchased her, one of several vessels the company purchased to support their colony for Free Blacks. As she traded with Sierra Leone, a French privateer captured her, though the British Royal Navy recaptured her only days later. She then traded more widely. A French squadron captured her in 1805 and burnt her.

Career
Nancy first appeared in the 1792 volume of Lloyd's Register with A. Patterson, master, Phynn & Co., owners, and trade London—Quebec.

EIC voyage (1793-1795): Captain Alexander Patterson sailed from the Lizard on 29 December 1793, bound for Bengal. Nancy reached Calcutta on 20 June 1794. She left Bengal on 3 September and by 25 September was at Madras. From there she reached Saint Helena on 10 December, and Kinsale on 12 February 1795. She arrived at Beachy Head on 26 February.

Four days later,  recaptured Nancy. Nancy arrived at Plymouth before 14 April.

The Peace of Amiens having taken effect in early 1802, Nancys new owners, operating out of Kingston upon Hull, started trading with France. With the resumption of war with France, they started trading more widely, sailing Nancy to the Mediterranean, the Baltic, and finally, the West Indies.

Fate
They had the misfortune on 8 June to encounter a Franco-Spanish fleet under Admiral Villeneuve. The two British warships managed to escape, but Villeneuve's fleet captured the entire convoy, valued at some five million pounds. He sent the convoy to Guadeloupe under the escort of the frigate . However, on her way Sirène encountered several British frigates. She escaped after burning the merchantmen on 17 June.

Notes

Citations

References

1792 ships
Age of Sail merchant ships
Merchant ships of the United Kingdom
Ships of the British East India Company
Captured ships